Laurence Duggan (1 January 1909 – 29 October 1996) was an Irish hurler who played for Kilkenny Senior Championship club Mooncoin. He played for the Kilkenny senior hurling team for three seasons, during which time he usually lined out as a right corner-forward. His brother, Jack Duggan, was a contemporary on the team.

Honours

Mooncoin
Kilkenny Senior Hurling Championship (2): 1932

Kilkenny
All-Ireland Senior Hurling Championship (1): 1935
Leinster Senior Hurling Championship (3): 1935, 1936, 1937

References

1909 births
1996 deaths
Mooncoin hurlers
Kilkenny inter-county hurlers